The 2015–16 Marshall Thundering Herd women's basketball team represents the Marshall University during the 2015–16 NCAA Division I women's basketball season. The Thundering Herd, led by third year head coach Matt Daniel, play their home games at the Cam Henderson Center and are members of Conference USA. They finished the season 17–15, 8–10 for in C-USA play to finish in a tie for sixth place. They advanced to the semifinals of the C-USA women's tournament where they lost to Middle Tennessee. They were invited to the Women's National Invitation Tournament where they lost in the first round to Ohio.

Roster

Rankings

Schedule

|-
!colspan=9 style="background:#009B48; color:#FFFFFF;"| Exhibition

|-
!colspan=9 style="background:#009B48; color:#FFFFFF;"| Non-conference regular season

|-
!colspan=9 style="background:#009B48; color:#FFFFFF;"| Conference USA regular season

|-
!colspan=9 style="background:#009B48; color:#FFFFFF;"| Conference USA Women's Tournament

|-
!colspan=9 style="background:#009B48; color:#FFFFFF;"| WNIT

See also
 2015–16 Marshall Thundering Herd men's basketball team

References

Marshall Thundering Herd women's basketball seasons
Marshall
2016 Women's National Invitation Tournament participants
Marsh
Marsh